Byrns is a surname. Notable people with the surname include:

Elinor Byrns (1876—1957), American lawyer and pacifist, co-founder of the Women's Peace Society
Harold Byrns (1903–1977), German-American conductor and orchestrator
Joseph W. Byrns Jr. (1903–1973), U.S. attorney and politician
Jo Byrns (1869–1936), U.S. Democratic politician
Samuel Byrns (1848–1914), U.S. member of Congress from Missouri

See also
Burns (surname)
Byrne
Byrnes
Bryne (disambiguation)
Daniel and Nellie Byrns House